Irish League football clubs have participated in European football competitions since 1957, when in the 1957–58 season, Glenavon took part in the European Cup – the first Irish League club to do so. In total, 16 clubs have represented Northern Ireland in European competition.

History
As of the 2020–21 season, the NIFL Premiership champions qualify for the UEFA Champions League. The runners-up, the Europa League play-off winners and the Irish Cup winners qualify for the UEFA Europa Conference League. If, however, the cup winners have already qualified for Europe by finishing first or second in the league, the Europa Conference League place goes to the league's third-placed club.

Only the league champions have ever represented the Irish League in the European Cup/Champions League. Glenavon were the first team ever to represent Northern Ireland in any of the four competitions, when in the first round of the 1957–58 European Cup they played out a 0–0 draw against Danish side AGF in Aarhus, Denmark on 11 September 1957. They played the home leg two weeks later, losing 3–0. In the 1959–60 season, Linfield became the first Irish League club to win a match in the competition, in what was their first ever European Cup match. They defeated Swedish side Göteborg 2–1 at Windsor Park on 9 September 1959, however two weeks later they lost the away leg 6–1 which meant that they lost the tie 7–3 on aggregate. Linfield hold the record of the most participations in the European Cup/Champions League by any Northern Irish club to date, having appeared in 27 seasons of the competition up to and including 2012–13.

Participation in the secondary competitions began with Glentoran in the 1962–63 Inter-Cities Fairs Cup against Spanish side Real Zaragoza. A 2–0 defeat in the first leg at the Oval was followed by a 6–2 defeat away from home in the second leg. They lost the tie 8–2 on aggregate. Glentoran hold the record of the most participations in the Inter-Cities Fairs Cup/UEFA Cup/UEFA Europa League by any Northern Irish club to date, having appeared in 21 seasons of the competition. They also hold the record of the most appearances by a Northern Irish club in European competitions overall, having appeared in 42 seasons up to and including 2013–14 – one season more than Linfield who have made 41 appearances.

In 1960, Glenavon were drawn to face East German side Wismut in the first round of the 1960–61 European Cup. However, they were forced to withdraw when they were refused visas for East Germany and Wismut were refused visas for the UK. UEFA had allowed the matches to take place in neutral countries but that was not financially viable for Glenavon, so they were left with no option but to withdraw. A similar issue arose the following season when in the first round of the 1961–62 European Cup, Linfield were drawn to face another East German team, Vorwärts. The away leg was played, which Linfield lost 3–0. However, Vorwärts were denied visas for the UK to play the second leg, and similarly to Glenavon the previous season, travelling to play the game in a neutral country was not financially viable for Linfield so they were also forced to withdraw from the competition.

In 1965, Derry City became the first Northern Irish club to win a two-legged European tie. In the 1965–66 European Cup, the club's last ever appearance in European competition as an Irish League club, they defeated Lyn 8–6 on aggregate in a high-scoring tie. In the second round, they faced Anderlecht from Belgium but suffered a huge 9–0 loss in the away leg and later withdrew from the competition before the second leg was played, when the Irish Football Association ruled that their home ground was not up to standard. In 1972, the club withdrew from senior Northern Irish football and after 13 years of playing amateur football in lower leagues, they joined the League of Ireland in the Irish Republic in 1985.

In 1969, both Coleraine and Glentoran entered the Inter-Cities Fairs Cup, the first time more than one Northern Irish club had ever been entered into the same European competition. Glentoran lost in the first round, but Coleraine impressively got through to the second round. The two most notable successes in Europe are Linfield reaching the quarter-finals of the 1966–67 European Cup and Glentoran reaching the quarter-finals of the 1973–74 European Cup Winners' Cup.

In 1976, Irish League B Division club Carrick Rangers won the Irish Cup by defeating strong favourites Linfield 2–1 in the final. This qualified them to take part in European competition for the first, and to date only time – in the 1976–77 European Cup Winners' Cup. They defeated Aris from Luxembourg 4–3 on aggregate in the first round, before going out 9–3 on aggregate to English side Southampton in the second round. To date, this is the only occasion that a club from outside the top division of football in Northern Ireland has represented the country in European competition.

The 1993–94 UEFA Champions League saw Linfield drawn to face Dynamo Tbilisi of Georgia in the preliminary round. After losing 3–2 on aggregate, they were reinstated when their opponents were expelled from the competition for allegedly attempting to bribe match officials. Linfield then went on to face Copenhagen in the first round proper. They won the first leg 3–0, but lost the second leg 4–0 after extra time. This proved costly, as victory would have meant a financially lucrative tie against eventual champions Milan in the next round. In July 2013, Linfield became the first Northern Irish club to win both the home leg and the away leg of a European tie. In the 2013–14 UEFA Europa League first qualifying round they were drawn to face ÍF Fuglafjørður from the Faroe Islands. They won the away leg 2–0 and then won the home leg 3–0 at Windsor Park to complete a comfortable 5–0 aggregate victory. In the second qualifying round they were drawn to face Skoda Xanthi of Greece and won the first leg 1–0 away from home despite being massive underdogs for the tie. This made it three consecutive victories in Europe for the club, without conceding a goal in the process – another first for a Northern Irish club. However, in the second leg at home they went down 2–1 after extra time, which eliminated them on the away goals rule.

In the 2019-20 UEFA Europa League, Linfield progressed to the Play-Off Round, defeating Azerbaijani champions Qarabag 3-2 at Windsor Park to get within one game of becoming the first ever Irish League club to qualify for the group stage of a UEFA competition. However they lost the second leg 2-1 in Baku, and were eliminated on the away goals rule.

Statistics
As of 26 August 2022

European Cup / UEFA Champions League
 First game played: AGF 0–0 Glenavon, 11 September 1957 (1957–58 European Cup first round, first leg)
 Most competitions appeared in: 33 – Linfield
 Most games played: 78 – Linfield
 Most wins: 11 – Linfield
 Most draws: 23 – Linfield
 Most defeats: 44 – Linfield

Inter-Cities Fairs Cup / UEFA Cup / UEFA Europa League
 First match played: Glentoran 0–2 Real Zaragoza, 26 September 1962 (1962–63 Inter-Cities Fairs Cup first round, first leg)
 Most competitions appeared in: 23 – Glentoran
 Most games played: 50 – Glentoran
 Most wins: 15 – Linfield
 Most draws: 9 – Glentoran / Linfield
 Most defeats: 36 – Glentoran

UEFA Europa Conference League
 First match played: Glentoran 1–1 The New Saints, 8 July 2021 (2021–22 UEFA Europa Conference League first qualifying round, first leg)
 Most competitions appeared in: 2 – Larne / Linfield
 Most games played: 8 – Larne
 Most wins: 4 – Larne
 Most draws: 3 – Linfield
 Most defeats: 2 – Cliftonville / Crusaders / Larne / Linfield

UEFA Cup Winners' Cup / European Cup Winners' Cup
 First match played: Glenavon 1–4 Leicester City, 13 September 1961 (1961–62 European Cup Winners' Cup preliminary round, first leg)
 Most competitions appeared in: 9 – Glentoran
 Most games played: 22 – Glentoran
 Most wins: 3 – Glentoran
 Most draws: 7 – Glentoran
 Most defeats: 12 – Glentoran

UEFA Intertoto Cup
 First match played: Cliftonville 0–3 Standard Liège, 22 June 1996 (1996 UEFA Intertoto Cup group stage)
 Most competitions appeared in: 3 – Cliftonville
 Most games played: 10 – Cliftonville
 Most wins: 2 – Newry Town
 Most draws: 2 – Cliftonville
 Most defeats: 7 – Cliftonville

Overall
 First match played: AGF 0–0 Glenavon, 11 September 1957 (1957–58 European Cup first round, first leg)
 Most competitions appeared in: 55 – Linfield
 Most games played: 137 – Linfield
 Most wins: 29 – Linfield
 Most draws: 35 – Linfield
 Most defeats: 73 – Linfield
 Biggest winning margin (match): 5 goals, joint record:
 Linfield 6–1 Aris (1966–67 European Cup first round)
 Coleraine 5–0 Sant Julià (2002 UEFA Intertoto Cup first round)
 Biggest winning margin (aggregate): 5 goals, joint record:
 Linfield 9–4 Aris (1966–67 European Cup first round)
 Coleraine 7–2 Sant Julià (2002 UEFA Intertoto Cup first round)
 Linfield 5–0 ÍF Fuglafjørður (2013–14 UEFA Europa League first qualifying round)
 Heaviest defeat (match): 11 goals – Dinamo Bucharest 11–0 Crusaders (1973–74 European Cup first round)
 Heaviest defeat (aggregate): 13 goals, joint record:
 Ards 1–14 PSV Eindhoven (1974–75 European Cup Winners' Cup first round)
 Glentoran 1–14 Ajax (1975–76 UEFA Cup first round)

UEFA coefficient and ranking
For the 2022–23 UEFA competitions, the associations will be allocated places according to their 2021 UEFA country coefficients, which will take into account their performance in European competitions from 2016–17 to 2020–21. In the 2021 rankings used to allocate berths for the 2022–23 European competitions, Northern Ireland's coefficient points total will be 6.958. After earning a score of 2.833 during the 2020–21 European campaign, Northern Ireland will remain as the 42th best association in Europe out of 54 for the second consecutive season.

 https://kassiesa.net/uefa/data/method5/crank2021.html Full list]

Appearances in UEFA competitions
As of 26 August 2022

Active competitions

European Cup / UEFA Champions League

PR = Preliminary round; 1R/2R = First/Second round; 1QR/2QR = First/Second qualifying round; QF = Quarter-finals

Inter-Cities Fairs Cup / UEFA Cup / UEFA Europa League

UEFA Europa Conference League

PR = Preliminary round; QR = Qualifying round; 1R/2R = First/Second round; 1QR/2QR/3QR = First/Second/Third qualifying round; PLR = Playoff round

Defunct competitions

European Cup Winners' Cup / UEFA Cup Winners' Cup

PR = Preliminary round; QR = Qualifying round; 1R/2R = First/Second round; QF = Quarter-finals

UEFA Intertoto Cup

GS = Group stage; 1R/2R = First/Second round

Notes

See also
 List of football matches between British clubs in UEFA competitions
 Association football in Northern Ireland

References

External links
UEFA Website
Rec.Sport.Soccer Statistics Foundation

European football clubs in international competitions
Europe
Europe